The Kawakawa River is in the Northland Region of New Zealand's North Island. It flows predominantly eastward to Opua, where it joins the Waikare Inlet to flow into the Veronica Channel at the southern end of the Bay of Islands.

The river is tidal up to the town of Kawakawa. The name changes to the Waiomio Stream, the Otiria Stream and the Waiharakeke Stream.

The longest wooden railway bridge in the Southern Hemisphere crosses the river at Taumarere as part of the Bay of Islands Vintage Railway.

See also
List of rivers of New Zealand

Far North District
Rivers of the Northland Region
Bay of Islands
Rivers of New Zealand